Sainte-Marguerite-sur-Mer (literally Sainte-Marguerite on Sea) is a commune in the Seine-Maritime department in the Normandy region in northern France.

Geography
Huge chalk cliffs rise up from a pebble beach overlooking the English Channel, to form the northern border of the commune.

Heraldry

Population

Places of interest
The Vastérival gardens.
 The church of St. Marguerite, dating from the eleventh century.
 The sixteenth-century château de la Tour and its dovecote.
 A donjon.
 The lighthouse, rebuilt in 1955.

See also
Communes of the Seine-Maritime department

References

External links

 Official website 
 Webcam of Sainte Marguerite sur Mer

Communes of Seine-Maritime
Populated coastal places in France